Alessia Tornaghi (born 3 July 2003) is an Italian figure skater. She is a two-time Italian national champion and the 2019 Golden Bear of Zagreb champion. On the junior level, she is the 2019 JGP Italy bronze medalist.

Personal life 
Alessia Tornaghi was born on 3 July 2003 in Milan, Italy.

Career

Early career 
Tornaghi began learning to skate in 2008. She was the 2015 Italian national novice champion and won seven medals internationally as an advanced novice. Tornaghi is the 2016 and 2017 Italian national junior silver medalist.

2017–2018 season 
Tornaghi made her junior international debut at 2017 JGP Austria, where she finished 14th. She then won the silver medal at 2017 Cup of Nice, the gold medal at 2017 Leo Scheu Memorial, and placed sixth at 2017 Merano Cup.

Tornaghi finished fourth at the 2018 Italian Championships behind Lucrezia Beccari, Lara Naki Gutmann, and Marina Piredda, after winning silver for the past two seasons. She finished her season with silver medals at 2018 Sofia Trophy and 2018 Coupe du Printemps and bronze medals at 2018 Jégvirág Cup and 2018 Egna Spring Trophy.

2018–2019 season 
Tornaghi began training with Viktoria Butsaeva in Moscow in September. She started the season with another 14th-place finish at 2018 JGP Slovakia. Tornaghi then finished sixth at 2018 Golden Bear of Zagreb and won silver medals at the 2018 Inge Solar Memorial–Alpen Trophy and the 2018 Christmas Cup.

Tornaghi won the gold medal in the senior division at the 2019 Italian Championships ahead of Lucrezia Beccari and Lara Naki Gutmann, but was not named to the 2019 Junior World Championships team. She went on to win the bronze medal at 2019 Skate Helena, golds at 2019 Sofia Trophy and 2019 Cup of Tyrol, and ended her season with the silver medal at 2019 Egna Spring Trophy.

2019–2020 season 
Tornaghi placed ninth at 2019 JGP Croatia before winning her first JGP medal, a bronze, at 2019 JGP Italy behind Russians Ksenia Sinitsyna and Anna Frolova. In her senior international debut, she placed fourth at 2019 CS Ice Star after a free skate comeback from twelfth in the short program. Tornaghi won her first senior title and international medal at 2019 Golden Bear of Zagreb after becoming the first Italian lady since Carolina Kostner to successfully complete a triple lutz-triple toe loop combination in the short program. She rallied from 13th after the short program to finish fifth at 2019 CS Warsaw Cup after finishing second in the free skate behind only eventual champion Ekaterina Kurakova of Poland.

Tornaghi won the gold medal for a second consecutive season at the 2020 Italian Championships, this time ahead of Marina Piredda and Lara Naki Gutmann. She will compete at the 2020 Winter Youth Olympics and the 2020 European Championships.

Tornaghi was chosen by the Italian National Olympic Committee to replace short track athlete Elisa Confortola as the flag-bearer for the Italian national team at the 2020 Winter Youth Olympics, after Confortola had scheduling conflicts. At the 2020 Winter Youth Olympics, she finished sixth in the individual event and helped Team Motivation to a fifth-place finish in the team event by placing third in the ladies free skating behind Ksenia Sinitsyna and Anna Frolova of Russia.

Tornaghi finished eighth at the 2020 European Championships.  She then finished the season with a thirteenth-place result at the 2020 World Junior Championships.  Tornaghi had been scheduled to represent Italy at the 2020 World Championships, but these were cancelled due to the COVID-19 pandemic.

2020–2021 season
Tornaghi was scheduled to make her senior Grand Prix debut at the 2020 Internationaux de France, but the event was cancelled as a result of the pandemic.

2022-2023 season 

Tornaghi switched her training location to Norwood, Massachusetts, with Alexei Letov and Olga Ganicheva.

Programs

Competitive highlights 
GP: Grand Prix; CS: Challenger Series; JGP: Junior Grand Prix

Detailed results 
Small medals for short and free programs awarded only at ISU Championships.

Senior results

Junior results

References

External links 
 

2003 births
Italian female single skaters
Living people
Figure skaters from Milan
Figure skaters at the 2020 Winter Youth Olympics
21st-century Italian women